Gangjin Baseball Park is a baseball stadium in Gangjin County, South Korea.

Baseball venues in South Korea
Sport in South Jeolla Province
Kiwoom Heroes
Sports venues completed in 2009
Gangjin County
2009 establishments in South Korea
Buildings and structures in South Jeolla Province